The Tauredunum event of 563 AD was a tsunami on Lake Geneva (then under the Frankish territory of the Kingdom of Orleans), triggered by a massive landslide which caused widespread devastation and loss of life along the lakeshore. According to two contemporary chroniclers, the disaster was caused by the collapse of a mountainside at a place called Tauredunum at the eastern end of Lake Geneva. It caused a great wave to sweep the length of the lake, sweeping away villages on the shoreline and striking the city of Geneva with such force that it washed over the city walls and killed many of the inhabitants.

A study published in October 2012 suggests that the Tauredunum landslide triggered the collapse of sediments that had accumulated at the point where the River Rhône flows into Lake Geneva. There is evidence of four previous mudslides, suggesting that tsunamis may be a recurrent phenomenon on Lake Geneva. It is also speculated that such an event could happen again, with far more severe consequences as more people live within potentially affected areas, and because most people are not accustomed to the idea of tsunamis happening in landlocked bodies of water and are thus unaware of the danger.

Historical accounts

The event was recorded in some detail by Gregory of Tours in his History of the Franks. He wrote:

Marius of Avenches also described the event in his Chronicle:

Tauredunum's location and tsunami-avalanche risks in the Alps
The location of Tauredunum has long been debated. Among other alternatives, it has been suggested that it was situated near the Bois Noir at Saint-Maurice or at the foot of the Pic du Blanchard near Saint-Gingolph. The landslide is now thought to have occurred on the mountain of Le Grammont, near Les Evouettes at the point where the Rhône empties into Lake Geneva. Mountainside collapses have caused similar though smaller lake tsunamis in at least three lakes in Switzerland – Lake Lucerne, Lake Lauerz and Lake Brienz. The danger is recognised by Switzerland's Federal Office for Civil Protection, which takes the risk of landslide-caused tsunamis into account in its disaster planning. Certain mountains, such as the Rigi and the Bürgenstock, present more of a risk. It is not uncommon for large boulders to fall off the Bürgenstock into Lake Lucerne, though this presents little risk of a tsunami because of the relatively low amount of energy released in such falls.

Proposed mechanism for tsunami of 563

A study by a team from the University of Geneva, led by Stéphanie Girardclos and Guy Simpson, has found that the tsunami of 563 may not have been directly caused by the landslide, but by the collapse of sediments on the lake bed. The team found a giant fan of turbidite – a mixture of sand and mud deposited by a rapid flow of water – spread across the lake bed. The fan extends in a north-west direction from the Rhône's mouth, where the river's flow has carved a series of canyon-like underwater channels. Biological material found in the turbidite enabled it to be dated to between 381 and 612, consistent with the date of the Tauredunum event.

It is hypothesised that the impact of the Tauredunum landslide destabilised sedimentary deposits at the mouth of the Rhône, causing their collapse and triggering a large tsunami. A wave this high would certainly have been capable of causing the destruction described by the chroniclers.

The team also found evidence of four older layers of turbidite, suggesting that such collapses have been a recurrent event since Lake Geneva formed at the end of the last ice age some 19,000 years ago. It is not yet known how frequently they have occurred – further investigation will be required to answer this question – but researcher Guy Simpson says, "It's certainly happened before and I think that we can expect that it will probably happen again sometime." Although most people's focus has been on marine tsunamis such as the 2004 Indian Ocean tsunami and the March 2011 tsunami in Japan, lakeside cities such as Geneva,  from the sea, are also at risk. Katrina Kremer notes that the risk of a fresh tsunami still exists, not just in Lake Geneva, but in other mountain lakes as well: "We have recognised that a tsunami risk applies to all lakes that have unstable slopes along the shore." However, she warns, "the risk is underestimated because most people just do not know that tsunamis can happen in lakes." The risk is particularly pronounced for the city of Geneva, given its position on low ground at the funnel-shaped end of the lake, which magnifies the effects of a tsunami. The impact of a new tsunami on the whole of Lake Geneva would be far more severe now than in 563, as over a million people now live along the lake's shores.

References

See also
Seiche

History of Geneva
Lake Geneva
563
Natural disasters in Switzerland
6th century in Switzerland
6th-century natural disasters
Landslides in Switzerland
0563 Tauredunum